This is list of musical groups (including bands, orchestras; individual list is for List of Estonian choirs) from Estonia. The list is incomplete.

References 

Musical groups